Christopher George Knight (born 1 December 1972 in Taunton, Somerset) is a former English cricketer. Knight was a right-handed batsman who bowled right-arm medium pace.

Knight made his List-A debut for the Hampshire Cricket Board in the 1st Round of the 2001 Cheltenham and Gloucester Trophy against the Kent Cricket Board. Knight's final List-A match came in 2nd Round of the 2002 Cheltenham and Gloucester Trophy, which was played in 2001 against Ireland.

Knight made a single appearance in the 1993 Second Eleven Championship for Hampshire Second XI against Leicestershire Second XI.

External links
Christopher Knight at Cricinfo
Christopher Knight at CricketArchive

1972 births
Living people
Sportspeople from Taunton
Cricketers from Somerset
English cricketers
Hampshire Cricket Board cricketers